Waste Services Incorporated (Commonly known as WSI) was a company that provided waste services in Canada and the United States (Florida) founded in 2001, the company's headquarters are in Burlington, ON.

History

The WSI brand is a company dealing with solid waste collection in Canada. The company predecessor was Capital Waste Services it was slowly absorbed into WSI just after the foundation of the company in 2001. The company has an enormous fleet of trucks in Canada and the U.S., the trucks are mostly front loader with some rear loaders and side loaders (mostly Labrie Expert 2000's). Today the company's website is still up but the company is defunct after merging in 2010.

Merging

On June 30, 2010 the company agreed to merge into BFI Canada and about 3 weeks later the company began rebranding as BFI Canada, the company quickly dissipated within 2 to 3 months. However, In the U.S. the company was rebranded as Progressive Waste Solutions because of the BFI Canada brand name (which is still in use even after being bought by Progressive Waste Solutions in 2000) only being used in Canada.

References

Waste companies established in 2001
Business services companies disestablished in the 21st century
Waste management companies of Canada
Waste management companies of the United States
Canadian companies established in 2001
American companies established in 2001 
Canadian companies disestablished in 2010
American companies disestablished in 2010